Headlights in the Fog (Italian: Fari nella nebbia) is a 1942 Italian drama film directed by Gianni Franciolini and starring Fosco Giachetti, Luisa Ferida and Antonio Centa. The film's art direction was by Camillo Del Signore. It was made at the Palatino Studios in Rome and on location in Piedmont and Liguria.

The film follows the lives of a group of truck drivers. It is considered to be part of the development of Neorealism, which emerged around this time.

Cast 
 Fosco Giachetti as Cesare 
 Luisa Ferida as Piera 
 Antonio Centa as Carlo detto "Brillantina" 
 Mariella Lotti as Anna 
 Mario Siletti as Gianni 
 Lauro Gazzolo as Egisto 
 Carlo Lombardi as Filippo 
 Nelly Corradi as Maria 
 Lia Orlandini as Evelina 
 Dhia Cristiani as Gemma 
 Arturo Bragaglia as Un ciabattino 
 Loris Gizzi as Rico 
 Massimo Turci as Il piccolo Ninetto

References

Bibliography 
 Gundle, Stephen. Mussolini's Dream Factory: Film Stardom in Fascist Italy. Berghahn Books, 2013.

External links 
 

1942 films
Italian drama films
Italian black-and-white films
1942 drama films
1940s Italian-language films
Films directed by Gianni Franciolini
Films set in Italy
Films shot in Italy
Films scored by Enzo Masetti
Films shot at Palatino Studios
1940s Italian films